Corella may refer to:

Biology 

Corella (bird), a member of a group of cockatoos from the subgenus Licmetis
Corella (journal), the journal of the Australian Bird Study Association, formerly called Australian Bird Bander
Corella (tunicate), a genus of sea squirts

Horticulture 

 Corella Pear, a variety of pear named after the Corella (bird). Also called the Forelle Pear.

People 

Ángel Corella, dancer with American Ballet Theatre

Places 

Corella, Bohol, Philippines
New Corella, Davao del Norte, Philippines
Corella, Queensland, a locality in the Gympie Region, Queensland, Australia
Corella, Spain
Corella, Italy